Anacampsis chlorodecta is a moth of the family Gelechiidae. It was described by Edward Meyrick in 1932. It is found in Manchuria.

References

Moths described in 1932
Anacampsis
Moths of Asia